King Richard II is a 1954 American film directed by George Schaefer for the Hallmark Television Playhouse TV series.  It starred actor Maurice Evans, who also adopted the teleplay from the original work by William Shakespeare.

Cast
Maurice Evans as Richard II
Kent Smith as Bolingbroke
Frederick Worlock as John of Gaunt
Bruce Gordon as Thomas Mowbray 
Richard Purdy as Duke of York
Louis Hector as Henry Percy

Production
The film was produced by Albert McCleery and directed by Schaefer.  Production and art design was overseen by Richard Sylbert. Costumer design was by Noel Taylor.

The screenplay was adapted by actor Evans from the play by Shakespeare.  Evans had performed Richard II on stage numerous times before. He had made his Shakespearean debut on TV in a 1953 Hallmark production of Hamlet.  King Richard II was sponsored by Hallmark for a reported $175,000.

Reception
The production was well received.

References

External links

1954 films
Films directed by George Schaefer
Hallmark Hall of Fame episodes